Liane Buhr ( Weigelt, born 11 March 1956 in Pritzwalk, Bezirk Potsdam) is a German rowing coxswain who competed for the SG Dynamo Potsdam / Sportvereinigung (SV) Dynamo. She won medals at the international rowing competitions.

After the 1976 Summer Olympics, she took a break from rowing, started a medical degree and married. She returned to international rowing as Liane Buhr at the 1978 World Rowing Championships in Cambridge, New Zealand, where she came fourth in the women's coxed quad sculls. Buhr is a general practitioner in Fichtenwalde, a suburb of Beelitz in Brandenburg.

References

External links
  

1956 births
Living people
People from Pritzwalk
People from Bezirk Potsdam
East German female rowers
Coxswains (rowing)
German general practitioners
Sportspeople from Brandenburg
Rowers at the 1976 Summer Olympics
Rowers at the 1980 Summer Olympics
Olympic gold medalists for East Germany
Olympic medalists in rowing
World Rowing Championships medalists for East Germany
Medalists at the 1980 Summer Olympics
Medalists at the 1976 Summer Olympics
Recipients of the Patriotic Order of Merit in gold